Siphonorhis is a genus of nightjars, known as the Caribbean pauraques, in the family Caprimulgidae.

It contains the following species:
 Jamaican pauraque (Siphonorhis americana), possibly extinct 
 Least pauraque or least poorwill (Siphonorhis brewsteri), native to Hispaniola
 Cuban pauraque (†Siphonorhis daiquiri), known only from fossil material

 
Bird genera
 
Taxa named by Philip Sclater
Higher-level bird taxa restricted to the West Indies
Taxonomy articles created by Polbot